Capital Television (CTV) is a state-owned TV channel in Belarus covering the whole country.

The corresponding closed joint-stock company "" was registered on October 19, 2000, and its first broadcast was on January 1, 2001. Initially it covered only the news from the capital city of Minsk, since 2005  the coverage includes the whole country.

Since November 2017 CTV started broadcasting in HDTV format.

References

External links

Television stations in Belarus
Television channels and stations established in 1956
Mass media in Minsk
2000 establishments in Belarus